Ascochyta doronici is a fungal plant pathogen that causes leaf spot on African daisy.

See also
List of Ascochyta species

References

Fungal plant pathogens and diseases
Eudicot diseases
doronici
Fungi described in 1878